This is a list of characters from the manga/anime series Sayonara, Zetsubou-Sensei. All the students in Nozomu Itoshiki's class are named after controversial social issues in Japanese society with the exception of Kafuka Fu'ura, whose real name has not been revealed.

Itoshiki family
As a running joke throughout the series, when the characters for "Itoshiki" (糸色) are written closely together, the resulting kanji can resemble , which often undoes the next character it is appended to. Thus writing  resembles . The manga eventually reveals that they aren't the original Itoshiki family, but merely the descendants of look-alikes paid to masquerade for the real family while they fled from those who wanted them dead. After the family vanished from the face of the earth, the look-alikes decided to remain as the Itoshiki family.

 

The main character, a high school teacher and the youngest son of the Itoshiki family. He always wears a hakama and kimono abroad, preferring flippant casual western clothing in his hometown. When his name is written horizontally it resembles , befitting his extremely negative, paranoid and pessimistic attitude. He often shouts "I'm in despair! [topic at hand] has left me in despair!" and attempts suicide several times, though rarely with serious intent. Most of the main girls seem to have feelings for him but only because they misunderstand what he said to each of them (during the episodes introducing them). His negative personality started blossoming when he was in his first year of high school when he 'accidentally' joined a 'Negative' club. He is based upon the main character from Dazai Osamu's No Longer Human, which is both Nozomu's and the author's favorite novel.

Nozomu's younger sister, a seventeen-year-old ikebana master. When her name is written horizontally it resembles , which describes her exceptional talent in various skills; however, calling her zetsurin evokes her fury, as the word is often used as slang for sexual prowess. She has revealed her willingness to marry out of the Itoshiki family in the hope of abandoning her unwanted name. Growing up privileged, she has misconceptions about poverty and engages in slum tourism.  Rin eventually transfers to Nozomu's school and becomes a student in his class, after which she frequently faces the readers/audience with her backside (in a parody of Shin-chan, who is also voiced by Akiko Yajima).

The third son of the Itoshiki family, with an uncanny resemblance to Nozomu. He is a medical doctor at the private Itoshiki Clinic. When his name is written horizontally it resembles , which explains why his hospital is rarely visited by the town's residents; he has a tendency to lose control of himself whenever he is referred to as "Zetsumei-sensei" ("Dr. Death").

The second son of the Itoshiki family, a surrealist painter who is quite full of himself. He has a wife named Yuka who is actually a large stain on the wall of his house. When his name is written horizontally it resembles .

The first son of the Itoshiki family, Majiru's father, who has yet to appear in the series. He is described as a lawyer who resembles his brothers.  His name becomes  when compressed, presumably hinting at his whereabouts. He is revealed to have started a posthumous marriage counseling business to help put dead souls to rest and divorce their ties from the world. He is also revealed to have been Nozomu's masked shadow doppelganger.

Nozomu's nephew, the son of Enishi. He was sent to live with Nozomu when his parents abandoned him. Although he is rather arrogant for his age, he is quite vulnerable to the psychological trauma caused by Nozomu's students. His name becomes  when compressed. It is hinted he has feelings for Nozomu's student Kiri Komori but so seems to hide this and refer to her as his big sister. Even though he is young, he likes older women and already shows signs of perversion, especially an attraction to hair.

The head of the Itoshiki family, a member of the National Diet. His name becomes  when written horizontally.

Matriarch of the Itoshiki family. Her name becomes  when written horizontally.  She is a cookbook author.

The Itoshiki family butler. He is called Sebastian by the students. He is often seen attending to Rin. He is the true heir to the Itoshiki fortune, being the last descendant of the actual family that Nozomu's ancestors impersonated.

Nozomu Itoshiki's students

Nozomu Itoshiki is the homeroom teacher for class 2-へ (2-He; the hiragana character へ is the sixth in iroha order, making it equivalent to "2-6" or "2-F" in more common terms). There are 32 students altogether, though many have yet to be introduced in the series. For a variety of reasons, the entire class ends up repeating their second year with Nozomu multiple times, but the characters themselves never age. It is eventually revealed that every character in the class has attempted suicide after falling into despair. Their lives were saved by transplants from Kafuka's corpse, allowing them to see her as a result. The manga version also reveals that the girls of the class have been possessed by the spirits of girls from the Showa era who had killed themselves, and that Nozomu is an exorcist that became their teacher so that the souls of the dead girls could finish their education and move on.

Female students

A somewhat strange and exceedingly optimistic student who always sees everything in the single most positive light possible due to a brain abnormality that causes increased serotonin output: the polar opposite of Nozomu, who sees only the dark side of things and is constantly in despair. She often has bizarre, childishly optimistic explanations for grim situations, calling suicide by hanging "becoming taller" and the act of stalking "deep love" and does not believe in the existence of hikikomori or illegal immigrants outside the realm of fiction. She enjoys giving whimsical nicknames to people (much to their annoyance), and has a strange obsession with aliens. Her cheerfulness apparently conceals a traumatic past. Her father is portrayed as trying to hang himself on multiple occasions, as did her mother at least once. 
At one point, her mother was possessed by demons. In addition, her recent actions; watching the school burn down with a satisfied grin, and the more harmless act of disguising herself as a college student and making food for Nozomu and his nephew (giving them food poisoning) hint at a much darker personality. Another hint is the fact that one or more of the other characters are mortally terrified of her; for example, when Kafuka teaches Meru about communication through eye contact, Meru can sense only bloodlust in her eyes. Kafuka's depiction with a bandaged right wrist in this scene may or may not be an indication that she attempted to cut her wrist. More hints of her ultimately sadistic temperament can be seen in the endings. Also on at least one occasion, she sensed the existence of demons in the area.
Kafuka Fūra is a pen name, taken from the name of author Franz Kafka, and is quite at odds with her sunny attitude. In another flashback, she had a name tag that said "An" on it. This would parallel Nozomu's comment in the first chapter about her personality resembling . For example, her attempt to save him at the start nearly killed him instead. In fact, this becomes a running gag in the series, with Kafuka frequently coming across Nozomu in the process of attempting to kill himself, hurriedly intervening and (whether accidentally or deliberately) nearly getting him killed anyway; on each of these occasions, Nozomu reacts by, ironically and in complete ignorance of the situation prior to Kafuka's intervention, asking in protest what she would have done if she had killed him. 
Near the end of the manga, it is revealed that Kafuka, renamed so from the "Metamorphosis" book she was carrying, had died prior to the beginning of the series and having her organs donated to a cast of characters that incidentally make up the majority of Nozomu's class. However, she was "too optimistic to die", and thus possessed one of the main female characters in every scene of the series. In the final chapter, the female students that had fallen for Nozomu hold a symbolic wedding ceremony with him, allowing both themselves and Kafuka to "marry" their beloved teacher. In a bonus chapter in the final volume, however, the ending plays out much differently: Nozomu officially marries the girls and moves to an isolated island, where he divorces and remarries each one every day depending on which girl Kafuka is currently controlling. The final chapter shows that Kafuka has entirely subverted the personalities of the twelve female students that married Nozomu, to the point where all of Nozomu's children look and act like her despite not being biologically related to her. The final page shows the girls adding a new "Kafuka" to the harem via a blood transfusion to a female reporter who was injured in a boat crash having come to interview the strange family.

A student who demands all things in her life to be precise, equal and conforming. This is most notable in her hair style, which is parted perfectly down the center. She often tries to set things straight and is usually extremely cruel and violent in her ways. She is also very knowledgeable in areas that revolve around violent international historical events. Despite being the most combative against Nozomu and his antics as well as usually being the most level headed of the class, she often demands him to marry her after they accidentally took a nap together in the same bed. Although she is not the class representative, she is often called so because of her exacting behavior. Her name derives from the Japanese word . 
Chiri occasionally displays psychic abilities via a third eye; her name contains two of the kanji in the word . Through Japanese mimetic, the term  can be taken to describe an item that is curly or fuzzy, which can reference Chiri's natural hair style which is curly rather than straight. She seems to know Harumi since childhood, and is sometimes seen around town with her. She is revealed to have an older sister named . It was revealed that due to her father's job, she would always move around when she was young and therefore unable to make friends and caused her obsession with symmetry to be born from a desire for some semblance of order and control in her life. With Harumi's insistence, they become friends however Chiri calls it "rivalry". A recurring gag occurs in the series that she would always be the one left out whenever there's a party or would be the "unwanted" one. This leads her in attempting to bury her classmates. In the later seasons of the anime, the punctuation marks of her sentences pop up in the bottom right corner of the screen. In the manga she is also the tea ceremony club president.

A girl who is always heavily bandaged, and assumed by most people to be the victim of domestic violence. She has a fetish for animal tails, and her injuries are actually caused by irate animals reacting to having their tails pulled by her. She works at the local zoo to indulge her obsession, and keeps an extensive collection of mounted animal tails in her room. She has differently-colored eyes because of a cornea transplant when she was younger, but this feature is not obvious because her transplanted cornea is usually covered by an eyepatch. Abiru claims that she has inherited the memory of the former owner of the cornea, having flashbacks of the license plate of the vehicle that ran over the donor. She has admitted having put on bandages even when not injured for the sake of attention. She is horrible in athletics as she always ended up having an injury in any sport she plays. Due to the actions of a "Shadow Doppleganger"  Nozomu receives in one chapter, Abiru mistakenly develops a crush on Nozomu. In  chapter 290, Abiru Kobushi removed her eye bandage and saw all the students including herself later as Kafuka Fuura.

A beautiful, fair-skinned girl whose looks are hidden behind her long hair and the blanket she wears most of the time. She is a hikikomori, and possibly agoraphobic, but Kafuka believes her to be a zashiki-warashi. Nozomu and Kafuka unintentionally frighten her out of her home during an attempt to persuade her to resume attending her classes, and she now takes up permanent residence in school. She also falls for Nozomu when he was judging her as a good double suicide partner. She spends most of her time in an unused room, but turns up every now and then in odd places such as school lockers or toilet cubicles, something that Nozomu doesn't pay much attention to, simply marking her attendance when he finds her. She eventually became his caretaker whenever Nozomu is at school, cooking for him and doing his laundry. As Kafuka believes her to be a zashiki-warashi, whenever she goes out, the building she is residing in collapses. In one chapter, she can actually go out of the building without it collapsing assuming that she is asleep because of the current gag in that chapter. Later in the series, she is seen using the internet more often and that she has a part-time job as a simple coder, saying that a NEET and a hikikomori is not the same thing.

A girl with short, straight-fringed hair who stalks whomever she falls in love with. She is also known for changing her manner of dress to partner those of her current love interest. She falls in love with Nozomu after misinterpreting one of his statements as a confession of love, and follows him wherever he goes, much to his dismay; even dressing up in a kimono similar to Nozomu and performing many of the duties of a Japanese wife (walking three steps behind, always by his side, etc), and has the uncanny ability to show up wherever he is (including jail). She has admitted to having read through Nozomu's mail and disposing of them before he gets a chance to read them. It is implied that she and Kiri fight over Nozomu behind the scenes. Later in the series, due to her stalking tendencies, she has an amazing ability to decipher long lost languages and unreadable codes.

A girl whose only trait is that she is completely ordinary (relative to her classmates); however, she takes offense at being called "normal," which she considers boring and undesirable. Her name derives from the Japanese term . Although it has not been referenced in the present, she attended elementary school with Kafuka, who may have been the first person to call her normal. It is worth mentioning that Nami isn't really a normal person at all, being both a truant and possibly self destructive; but since those are relatively normal behaviors for a neglected person seeking attention, in addition to the extremities that her classmates provides, she does, by comparison, indeed end up as nothing short of normal. 
When she attended junior high school, her nickname was Namihei (なみ平), which is also the name of a character from the manga Sazae-san. She often uses Apple-related products such as an iPhone and a MacBook, and seems to especially enjoy ramen. Later in the series, she becomes more and more treated as a gag character. She is also revealed as a person who always look after her weight, and her security blanket is diet pills. Due to this, she often talks about eating large amount of foods that the recurring gag of everyone in the series calling her normal has turned into "Only for Nami" right after she talks about trying to eat different types of food (which also becomes a recurring gag). In the planning stages of Sayonara, Zetsubou-Sensei, she was originally planned to be the main heroine.

An undocumented immigrant of unconfirmed nationality, though various clues (her Hispanicized real first name, dark-brown skin tone, civil status, and the war-torn state of her country of former habitual residence, which is within Asia) have shown that she is most likely Filipino (who are the 3rd largest foreign community in Japan). In one episode, however, she references Thai boxer Napa Kiatwanchai, suggesting that she may be Thai.
She is nicknamed "Mataro" by Kafuka, although she refers to herself (as do most others) as simply "Maria". She purchased the koseki of a male student and is attending school under his name. She is fascinated by "Japan's abundance" and hoards food and refuse she finds on the ground or in garbage cans for her massive family, who all live in a one-room apartment. While Maria frequently displays wild behavior and an unusual abhorrence to panties and shoes, her impoverished appearance and status, coupled with a bright smile, often encourage people to happily give her things.
Because of their optimistic personalities, Kafuka and Maria get along quite well. After spending some time with her, Chiri takes it upon herself to watch over Maria after being touched by her unwavering optimism and love for Japan. When the class was asked to expose a secret about themselves (Zoku Sayonara Zetsubou Sensei episode 08) Maria said she was a boy, although this has not been mentioned again.

A very shy girl who does not talk and only communicates via text messaging on her cell phone; she is notably and viciously abusive in her e-mails. Her family name, Otonashi, means "soundless", and her given name derives from the loan word . She is called "MeruMeru" by her father. Aside from a few weak sounds and squeaks, she is essentially mute, and any attempt to speak will cause her to uncontrollably sputter in a horrific, dial tone-esque language. 
Meru's family seems ridiculously rich, as her father is able to set up an audition for people to try and dub her voice in real time. In the anime, her voice actress changes every episode and is chosen at random, and is credited with, at most, a short sequence of nonsense characters with the exception of episode 6 of Zoku, where she is voiced by Chiwa Saito. On a later chapter, in theme with the current gag of that chapter, she lost her phone and was unable to communicate with anyone. Due to the gag, everyone did not acknowledge her as Meru due to her defining character as a character who talks via cellphone, so when Kafuka believes that she really is Meru, she finally muttered a soft "Thank You" in tears.

A returnee to Japan suffering from dissociative identity disorder. One is an ultimately Japanese woman named Kaede, a very gentle personality well-versed in Japanese culture. The other is a foreigner named Kaere who is disgusted by Japanese culture and touts the bizarre ways of the country she is supposedly from, though what country she comes from is never explained (it is hinted that it may be Russia or the United States). Kaere is easily offended and constantly threatens to sue everyone. 
Kaede/Kaere likes to pretend to be good at speaking English, but her English actually sounds horrifyingly bad, although this had to be pointed out by a foreigner for anyone to notice. She unfortunately adopts the latter personality more often. Her given name derives from Japanese , the imperative form of the verb , and also from Kaela Kimura, a Japanese idol. She provides many panty shots, often with strange images on her panties. She possessed a third personality, a balance between the two, until she came to 2-He, where her interactions with the other students triggered a psychotic breakdown.  A running gag is that she possesses a horrible singing voice. Her embarrassing wish is revealed to be able see a green kappa in person.

A shy, insecure girl who constantly apologizes for trivial matters and things she didn't even do. At one point she was mistaken by several boys as a tsundere. Her name in Eastern order sounds like , and is most likely borrowed from former Morning Musume member Ai Kago. She seems to like red king crabs, receiving a printed t-shirt of it from Kino and buying a box of it at a convenience store. She is revealed to also be a female ninja as her last name due to a pun on her name being the same character as the two top ninja training school in Japan.

A married high-schooler who works multiple jobs to pay off her husband's debts. Her name derives from  It is revealed in episode 5 of Zan that her husband is unfaithful and she's aware of it. A running gag from her is that whenever she contribute to the topic of the chapter, it would always lead to her saying it's okay not to pay the debts, in which Itoshiki would retort saying that it's better to pay. As she is considered a mother, she has a screwed maternal instincts that usually leads to kidnapping various people on the topic of the chapter. She was able to "hostage" all of these people in an expensive mansion saying that she has a beneficiary, in which Itoshiki retorted that it's better to use the money to pay back her debt instead. It was also revealed that she has tried multiple times to divorce her husband but was unable to. In one chapter when she becomes a personification of a herb, Itoshiki tries to dry her but was arrested because of a pun of her name which spells out marijuana, a substance highly illegal in Japan.

An evil-looking girl who compulsively commits malicious acts (such as putting sticks up the rear ends of dogs) so as to be scolded. Not wanting to be accused of reacting to stereotypes, people simply assume she is a good girl who only looks evil and whatever she did was not her doing. Just as with most girls in the class, she has developed a crush on Nozomu (due to him calling her out), but can only express her love through harming him. Maria made the comment of her being a tsundere.

A very open-minded girl that can not refuse to entertain new ideas and let other people express their ideas, even if it means possible negative effects on herself or her property. Kanako is depicted as being perpetually lost in thought and carrying a care-free stare; it cannot be ruled out that her mannerisms lend themselves to drug usage. Her name derives from the phrase . She usually wears her hair in a pony tail restrained by a large ribbon and keeps her hands buried inside the sleeves of her school uniform; possibly because it is a size or two too big for her. The zipper on the side of her skirt is always open an ostensibly welcoming manner.

A girl that works as a street-vendor to earn money. She partners up with Nezu, and together they employ rather questionable business methods. She often sells luxurious items, such as premium cuts of fish, at a cheap price.

A merchant girl and friends with Shōko. In partnership with Shōko, she sells common complimentary items, such as block of ice, with a hefty price tag. She is usually the ones who initiates the scam and lead to most of the class caught up in her business deals. She created an idol group along with Shoko that includes Nami.

A net idol. Her website of heavily photoshopped images is extremely popular; in reality she is overweight and unattractive, and wears Gothic Lolita-fashion. Her name is derived from voice actress Kotono Mitsuishi. She is very narcissistic and thinks that she is the prettiest girl in class.

A tea ceremony club member who likes Kino, but despairs at his fashion sense. She can be identified with her double bun hairstyle. She is only a provisional tea club member because she Chiri will not allow her to join half-heartedly. She is also extremely lucky and Chiri considers her a "time-thief" based on the current gag in that chapter. She usually appears in chapters regarding love.

A fan of yaoi and cat ears, and a doujin artist. She has an innate coupling instinct, imagining slash pairings between all sorts of (male) characters, her favorite couple being Pine × Napple, though apparently she cannot accept boys' love in real life. Her tastes are considered unusual, even abnormal, which often puts her at odds with Chiri. She possesses amazing natural athletic abilities, with various athletic clubs chasing her for recruitment. Her three older brothers are all involved in the anime industry, and according to her mother, she was an accidental child. She and Chiri have known each other since they were both children so both of them have a strong friendship (although Chiri insists that it's called rivalry).

Male students

Another friend of Kino and Haga who is nearly as negative as Nozomu. In the manga, Aoyama was also given the responsibility to become the substitute 'Mr. Despair' which he keeps up for a couple chapters. He gave up his post after the girls in the class keep bringing up more disturbing things that inadvertently make him look on the brighter side of things. Identified as the one with red glasses.

The actual class president of 2-He, who is ignored to the point of literally vanishing; only when his baldness is exposed does he become visible to others. In the anime, he has a major crush on Abiru, but leers after most female students (especially Kaere), who naturally do not notice he is there. His name is a pun on the phrase , referring to his lack of presence. The  also refers to his thinning hairline. He admits that he has a leg fetish. It seems he was turned into a masochist by Chie-sensei.

Jun is described in episode 4 of the second season as "Genius Storyteller"; there is no story he can't tell. His stories usually drive other characters to tears even though some of his stories have a mocking purpose. He has previously checked out every book in the library Nozomu wants to read, and lives with his grandfather (a reference to Seiji Amasawa in Whisper of the Heart). His parents, who were Christian, disowned him for getting a blood transfusion and led to an attempted suicide and a transplant from Kafuka's corpse. He is shown to live on the same island as Nozomu and his "wives", but escaped the fate that befell the girls for an unknown reason, though it is possible that, due to him living at the island's church, he was able to have Kafuka's spirit exorcised from his body.

Kuniya is described in episode 10 of the second season as "Library committee member, hates losing. Supposed to appear as a rival character to Jun Kudō, but his strange clothes and interest in Kaga Ai are now his most notable traits." His fashion sense is terrible; a scene in the manga showed strange underwear hanging from his balcony. His mother is a fashion designer and was the one who designed Kino's clothes. He relatively had fashionable clothes but started to become weird when her mother was fired. However, that doesn't seem to be the reason for his horrible fashion sense. His name comes from the Books Kinokuniya chain.

The perverted friend of Kino and Aoyama. He is the third substitute for "Mr. Despair".

(name unknown)

A student with a butch haircut like a jizō. He read a pornography named , so he is sometime called . He wears an earring in chapter 19 (episode 8 of the anime's first season), earning the nickname . He has more appearance on the manga than in the anime.

Other students

The real Tarō Sekiutsu who sold his own family register to Tarō Maria Sekiutsu. The origin of the name is the same as Maria and refers to him. He sold his name as it was the only possession he had left which prevented him from experiencing complete and total freedom. He is usually found in random places like Kiri Komori and is seen sitting in a cardboard box selling his possessions, wearing a lamp shade over his head with holes for his eyes.

Wataru is a hardcore otaku who puts more priority on his hobby than anything else, even once rushing into his burning house rescue his possessions, despite his sister also being trapped inside. He is not in Nozomu's class, but from the neighboring Class 2-ほ (2-Ho, "2-5", "2-E"). He sometimes wears a stereotypical hero costume with a mask and cape.

A former male student of Class 2-He. He leaves the class by the promotion. He is an otaku who wants to be an animator. He looks like Wataru Manseibashi but with a different hairstyle. His surname, Suzuki, can mean "to continue", and his given name is likely derived from (sono ko) which means "that child", therefore his full name roughly translates to "the child that continued"; a reference to his promotion.

A former male student of Class 2-He. He leaves the class by the promotion. He belongs to the soccer club.

A former male student of Class 2-He that has transferred to another school. Apparently nobody remaining in the class knew who he was. His name is a pun on the phase  which means "only for a moment".

School staff

The school counselor. Her name can also be read "Niichie", a reference to Friedrich Nietzsche. She has an excellent figure and a large bust, which is admired by the local people during the swimming pool scene. A case of sexual fetishism features her as a sadist rebuking various masochistic males, often featured in the beginning of various episodes. Nozomu usually does anything she orders him to do (like getting Kiri Komori back to school) as he states her eyes are terrifying, but he goes to her anytime he has one of his suicidal breakdowns brought on because of a random conspiracy theory. She once stated she had three husbands. Terrifyingly beautiful, she once had hoped to be an idol but was rejected because she looks "too pretty". Her recurring gag in the series is that her clothes will always be stolen and is replaced by a high school uniform.

School teacher, Nozomu's colleague. He is generally gentle, but he is also unusually aware of his surroundings, and his back is covered with a large tattoo that suggests a past with the yakuza. He is a fan of Nightmare.

A middle-aged man who came to 2-He from the Ministry of Education via "golden parachute," which launches a discussion of "descent" from one sector of life to another and leads to Nozomu re-visiting his previous life.

Others

The self-proclaimed "old friend" of Nozomu Itoshiki, who, like Nozomu, likes old things. It is later found out that they weren't , but rather  in elementary school. His name is a reference to the anime series Ikkyū-san. He attempted to marry Rin, thus gaining an "old name" and becoming a member of an "old family", but Kafuka thwarted him in his advances. He is the only person who can do a half smile and it seems he always does so.

Disheveled, unshaven, and overworked self-insert of the author.

 (first season's stage name is MAEDAX and second season's is MAEDAX G and third season is MAEDAX Roman or MAEDAX R)
The bald, bespectacled model of the character is Kumeta's assistant, Maeda. Appears often in the animated version in self-imposed restraint marks. He plays the voice of himself.

Another assistant of the author. Although unlike Maeda-kun he rarely shows up, but often talked about by the author. He was based from Kenjiro Hata, former assistant of the author and current author of Hayate no Gotoku.

Chiri's older sister, and in contrast to her, a complete slob who creates disarray and spreads trash by her mere presence. According to Harumi, Tane would not have been so dirty had it not been for Chiri. In a flashback, a young Chiri and Tane were shown with a pet goldfish. Chiri suggests cleaning the goldfish by pouring shampoo into the tank, which Tane tried convincing her not to. Tane then leaps into a pile of mud and distracts Chiri from drowning the fish in shampoo, which Nozomu understands as a way to suppress Chiri's proper behavior. Tane also expressed that if it were up to her, she would like to be able to dress up nicely and go on dates like a typical girl. Like some of the other girls in Nozomu's class, Tane also develops a crush on him. Her name derives from the Japanese word .

She is a "college student" living beside Nozomu's house, who often gives him food. Nozomu seems to have a crush on her, having a picture of her at home, and often blushes when he talks to her. She is Kafuka Fuura in disguise wearing a wig and often gives Nozomu and Maijiru food poisoning. She belongs to the idol group "AKaBane84" as Nari Oto (尾吐菜梨, Oto Nari). Her name derives from the Japanese word otonari (お隣, "neighbor").

Real name unknown. She appeared in chapter 128 to give Nozomu a love letter with the words  on it. It is speculated that she is Kafuka in disguise. She also works in a maid cafe.

Abiru's father who was falsely suspected to be abusive at the beginning of the series.

Meru's overprotective father. He will do anything for Meru, even try to find a person who will voice her.

Leader of the Seventh Secret Society Darkness Patriot Corps. The successor of the Despair Fist.

The judge of "The Mystery Darkness Court." The long-haired woman who put on the mask of the half drawn game from the middle. Most characters assume she is Chiri, who later appears contemporaneously with the judge, disproving this.

A foreigner who went to Japan and tries to force open anything and everything around him. He is Kafuka's friend and he is nicknamed as Goku by her, which could be a reference to either a main character from the novel Journey to the West, or the main character from the manga and anime Dragon Ball. He is based on Commodore Matthew C. Perry.

A Shōgun with extremely long chonmage. He is personification of the cold waves from the Siberian High. He said that he wanted to quit on being the General of Winter and is currently searching for another General-level work

One of the famous Vocaloid characters. She joined an audition for the voice of Meru, but failed. Her voice in the anime was not created using the Vocaloid synthesizer, but rather voiced by her original voice provider Saki Fujita.

An anime character for the voice actress herself.

(unnamed friend of Maria)

A friend of Maria who often appears beside her most of the time holding a gun. She only spoke during the "Zetsubou-Sensei Drawing Song".

Background characters

A deformation of a chick of an emperor penguin. It has appeared in the scenery since chapter 20. Its face resembles a deformed three-sided yin-yang. General Winter yields to this creature because it has a title of an emperor on its name.

A stork that delivers babies, and sounds like a passing jet. It has appeared in the scenery since chapter 41.

A dog that has a stick inserted into its anus by Mitama. It has appeared in the scenery since chapter 46.

A parody of Japanese cinemas public service announcement against bootleg recording. It has appeared in the scenery since chapter 53.

A female spy from a certain nation. She has appeared in the scenery since chapter 126.

A Japanese journalist. Her likeness has appeared in the scenery since chapter 13.

The 92nd Prime Minister of Japan. His likeness in the manga has appeared in the scenery since chapter 59.

The 90th Prime Minister of Japan.

A man with sharp head. He has appeared in the scenery since an extra chapter in Magazine Dragon December 12, 2007 (a supplement of Weekly Shonen Magazine).

Character from Katte ni Kaizō.  He has appeared in the scenery since riding a train on chapter 3.

Trivia
There was a cameo of Akiyuki Shinbo (director of this anime) on episode 10 of the second season wherein he along with some people discuss on how this anime should end.

Notes and references

External links
 Manga official website 
 Anime official websites:
 First series official website 
 Second series official website 
 Third series official website 
 Series 3.5 official website 

Lists of anime and manga characters
Kōji Kumeta